Vitebsky may refer to:

Vitebsky Rail Terminal, a terminus in Saint Petersburg, Russia
Vitebsky Central Sport Complex, a sports venue in Vitebsk, Belarus

People with the surname
Piers Vitebsky, British anthropologist